Berbericeras is an extinct genus of cephalopod in the subclass Ammonoidea.

References

Jurassic ammonites
Fossils of Iran
Bathonian life